Surf Pines is an unincorporated community in Clatsop County, Oregon, United States. It is a private gated community, located three miles north of Gearhart, just west of U.S. Route 101.

The community was created in 1944 by developer Barney Lucas. Lucas and his partners developed lots in the Surf Pines area and these were sold beginning in the 1950s. The Surf Pines Association was created in 1969 to help pay for the upkeep of roads. Properties were added to the community in the 1980s and 1990s, and security gates were added in 1990.

References

Unincorporated communities in Clatsop County, Oregon
Oregon Coast
Gated communities in Oregon
1944 establishments in Oregon
Unincorporated communities in Oregon